Brendon Ulysses Phillips (born 16 July 1954) is a Jamaican former professional footballer who played in the Football League for Mansfield Town and Peterborough United.

Management career

Halesowen Town
Phillips managed Halesowen Town between 2001–2004.

Phillips managed Coalville Town between 2006-2007.

References

1954 births
living people
Jamaican footballers
Association football midfielders
English Football League players
Leicester City F.C. players
Peterborough United F.C. players
Burton Albion F.C. players
Nuneaton Borough F.C. players
Kettering Town F.C. players
Boston United F.C. players
Scarborough F.C. players
Shepshed Dynamo F.C. players
Corby Town F.C. players
Aylesbury United F.C. players
Bedworth United F.C. players
Stafford Rangers F.C. players
Nuneaton Borough F.C. managers
Halesowen Town F.C. managers
Coalville Town F.C. managers
Jamaican football managers
People from Saint Catherine Parish